Brissopsis pacifica is a species of sea urchins of the family Brissidae. Their armour is covered with spines. Brissopsis pacifica was first scientifically described in 1898 by Alexander Emanuel Agassiz.

References 

Animals described in 1898
pacifica